Jo Hyun-soo (born September 29, 1993), better known by his stage name twlv (pronounced "twelve"), is a South Korean singer-songwriter and record producer. He began his music career by uploading songs onto music sharing website SoundCloud and collaborating with rapper Superbee. twlv released his solo mini-album Contents ½ in 2018 and competed on SBS TV's survival program The Fan. He signed with Yng & Rich Records the following year and has released several records, including his first studio album K.I.S.S (2020).

Early life and career beginnings
twlv was born Jo Hyun-soo on September 29, 1993, in Cheongju, North Chungcheong Province. He attended Korea National University of Transportation in Chungju and graduated from the Department of Aeronautical & Mechanical Design Engineering. He completed his mandatory military service and began working on music upon his return. He began uploading song recordings and a mixtape entitled Nobody (2018) onto sharing website SoundCloud under the stage name Twelve. He then altered his name by omitting the vowels and continued as twlv. He reached out to rapper Superbee via a direct message and asked him to listen to his songs, resulting in the two working together.

Career
On June 1, 2018, Superbee and twlv released the OrO-produced single "Ladies Love Dogs" featuring Jindotgae. Thematically revolving around the story of two young friends who suddenly become wealthy, the pair jointly released the project albums Moolood Gang Tape and Moolood Gang Tape II through the label Ghood Life Crew on June 15 and 29, respectively. In contrast to the trap music of his collaborative works, twlv released his debut solo EP Contents ½ and its synth-pop lead single "Bodytalk" on August 5. He was introduced as an R&B vocalist by Superbee and Dok2 on SBS TV's survival program The Fan, where he contended to accumulate the most votes and viral aggregates to win the competition. He sang a rendition of G.Soul's "You" on the second episode of the series, which garnered him positive reception from the Fan Masters. twlv earned 264 points out of 300, the highest of the episode, which allowed him to progress into the second round. He faced off against singers Youra and O.When and defeated them both by earning 250 points after performing "Bodytalk". twlv advanced into the top five and performed Taeyeon's "I" in a one-on-one battle against Yongzoo, but was eliminated upon scoring 113 points to the latter's 172 points.

On February 11, 2019, Yng & Rich Records announced that twlv had signed with the agency. He released the mini-album Blueline the following month, which included two live versions of songs he performed on The Fan and a guest feature by the show's runner-up Bibi. twlv produced his record label's first group single entitled "Golf Wang" released on July 15, where he joined Superbee and Uneducated Kid on the track. twlv released his first studio album K.I.S.S on January 18, 2020. He collaborated with rapper Tiger JK on "Censored Love Song" and its uncensored version "Kiss Kiss Bang Bang". The lyrics express the frustration of social distancing amid the COVID-19 pandemic and the single's proceeds were donated to fight the disease. twlv took part in Chancellor's "Automatic" along with Babylon, Moon, Bibi, and Jiselle, and the project single was released on October 14. A remix including 28 R&B guest singers was issued the following month.

On April 15, 2021, The Tilde Entertainment announced that twlv had signed an exclusive contract with the agency. He released the two-track single Echoes headed by "Rewind" on April 27.

Musical style
twlv produces R&B, hip hop, and house music with the intention of "having fun and making money". Mass appeal drives his musical direction; he believes songs should be easy to listen to and possess relatable lyrics to sing along with. Music website Rhythmer classified him as among the few domestic singers who possess "hip-hop vocals".

Discography

Albums

Studio albums

Extended plays

Mixtapes

Singles

As lead artist

As featured artist

Guest appearances

Soundtrack appearances

Filmography

References

External links
 

1993 births
House musicians
Korea National University of Transportation alumni
Living people
People from Cheongju
South Korean contemporary R&B singers
South Korean hip hop singers
South Korean record producers
South Korean singer-songwriters